André Joseph Armand Pronovost (born July 9, 1936) is a Canadian former professional ice hockey forward. Pronovost played in the National Hockey League (NHL) and several minor professional leagues in North America between 1955 and 1972. Pronovost was a member of four Stanley Cup-winning teams of the Montreal Canadiens in the 1950s. André is often confused as being the brother of Marcel, Claude, and Jean Pronovost but is unrelated.

Playing career
Pronovost began his career with the Montreal Canadiens in the 1956 season. He also played with the Boston Bruins, Detroit Red Wings, and Minnesota North Stars. Pronovost was a member of four Stanley Cup winning teams in 1956–57, 1957–58, 1958–59, and 1959-60, all during the Canadiens' dynasty.

Personal
Pronovost's grandson, Anthony Mantha, currently plays for the Washington Capitals. Pronovost was in attendance for Mantha's first NHL goal as a member of the Detroit Red Wings, against the Montreal Canadiens on March 24, 2016. His granddaughter, Elizabeth Mantha, is an on-ice official in the American Hockey League.

Career statistics

Regular season and playoffs

References

External links

1936 births
Living people
Baltimore Clippers players
Boston Bruins players
Canadian ice hockey coaches
Canadian ice hockey left wingers
Detroit Red Wings players
Ice hockey people from Quebec
Jersey Devils players
Memphis South Stars players
Memphis Wings players
Minnesota North Stars players
Muskegon Mohawks players
Montreal Canadiens players
Phoenix Roadrunners (IHL) players
Pittsburgh Hornets players
Shawinigan Dynamos coaches
Shawinigan-Falls Cataracts (QSHL) players
Sportspeople from Shawinigan
Stanley Cup champions